Hasarius is a spider genus of the family Salticidae (jumping spiders).

H. neocaledonicus was removed from Hasarius in 2008 and put in its own genus, Rhondes.

Species
 Hasarius adansoni (Audouin, 1826) – Cosmopolitan
 Hasarius bellicosus Peckham & Peckham, 1896 – Guatemala
 Hasarius berlandi Lessert, 1925 – East Africa
 Hasarius biprocessiger Lessert, 1927 – Congo
 Hasarius bisetatus Franganillo, 1930 – Cuba
 Hasarius cheliceroides Borowiec & Wesolowska, 2002 – Cameroon
 Hasarius dactyloides (Xie, Peng & Kim, 1993) – China
 Hasarius egaenus Thorell, 1895 – Myanmar
 Hasarius glaucus Hogg, 1915 – New Guinea
 Hasarius inhonestus Keyserling, 1881 – New South Wales
 Hasarius insignis Simon, 1885 – Comoro Islands
 Hasarius insularis Wesolowska & van Harten, 2002 – Socotra
 Hasarius kulczynskii Zabka, 1985 – Vietnam
 Hasarius kweilinensis (Prószyński, 1992) – China
 Hasarius lisei Bauab & Soares, 1982 – Brazil
 Hasarius mahensis Wanless, 1984 – Seychelles
 Hasarius mccooki Thorell, 1892 – Java
 Hasarius mulciber Keyserling, 1881 – Queensland
 Hasarius obscurus Keyserling, 1881 – New South Wales
 Hasarius orientalis (Zabka, 1985) – Vietnam
 Hasarius pauciaculeis Caporiacco, 1941 – Ethiopia
 Hasarius peckhami Petrunkevitch, 1914 – Dominica
 Hasarius roeweri Lessert, 1925 – East Africa
 Hasarius rufociliatus Simon, 1897 – Seychelles
 Hasarius rusticus Thorell, 1887 – Myanmar
 Hasarius sobarus Thorell, 1892 – Sumatra
 Hasarius testaceus (Thorell, 1877) – Sulawesi
 Hasarius trivialis (Thorell, 1877) – Sulawesi

References

Salticidae
Salticidae genera
Cosmopolitan spiders